Fernand Lemay (1 June 1894 – 31 December 1980) was a French racing cyclist. He rode in the 1924 Tour de France. His nephew Fernand was also a professional cyclist, he completed the 1936 Tour de France.

References

1894 births
1980 deaths
French male cyclists
Place of birth missing